Romina Sarina Oprandi (born 29 March 1986) is a retired tennis player. She has dual Swiss-Italian citizenship and represented Italy from her professional debut in 2005 until January 2012, when she joined the Swiss tennis federation.

She has won 26 singles titles and 11 doubles titles on the ITF Women's Circuit, and also one doubles title on the WTA Tour. On 10 June 2013, she achieved a career-high singles ranking of world No. 32.

Early years and playing style
Romina was born to parents Roberto and Romy in Jegenstorf. She is currently coached by her brother, Romeo Oprandi. Her favourite surface is clay.

Oprandi is a strong baseliner. She particularly enjoys playing drop shots.

Tennis career

2005–2006
Oprandi first came to prominence in the top tier of women's tennis when she reached the quarterfinals of a WTA Tier I event in Rome as a qualifier, losing to Svetlana Kuznetsova, 4–6, 7–5, 6–7. Romina won an ITF singles title at Denain, which was her best result for the rest of the 2006 season.

2007-2009
Oprani played several tournaments on the main tour, including the Australian Open, Doha, Indian Wells, Miami, Amelia Island, Charleston, Rome, and the French Open. At Barcelona, she retired in the first round. Romina then did not play for the rest of the 2007 season and the first half of the 2008 season due to a right forearm injury.

She returned to tennis in August 2008 at an ITF event in Monteroni d'Arabia, Italy. She won an ITF tournament in Wahlstedt, Germany and reached the final in Mestre, Italy.

Oprandi played in her first WTA Tour event in over 18 months 2009 in Bogotá, Colombia where she lost in the first round, 6–3, 6–7, 6–7. She won the doubles title at Buchen, partnering Sandra Martinović.

2012-2014
On 12 August 2012, Oprandi defeated Anna Chakvetadze 5–7, 6–3, 6–3 to win the EmblemHealth Open singles title held in Bronx, New York.

She reached two WTA singles semifinals in 2013, in Oeiras and Brussels, but then suffered a shoulder injury which kept her out of action for eight months.

In April 2014, Oprandi reached her first WTA Tour final at the third time of asking by beating top seed Daniela Hantuchová in the semifinals at the Marrakech Grand Prix. She lost 3–6, 6–3, 3–6 to María Teresa Torró Flor in the final. The same day, she won her first WTA doubles title at the same tournament, partnering with Garbiñe Muguruza to defeat Katarzyna Piter and Maryna Zanevska 4–6, 6–2, [11–9] in the final.

Grand Slam performance timelines
Only main-draw results in WTA Tour, Grand Slam tournaments, Fed Cup and Olympic Games are included in win–loss records.

Singles

Doubles

WTA career finals

Singles: 1 (1 runner-up)

Doubles: 1 (1 title)

ITF Circuit finals

Singles: 41 (26 titles, 15 runner-ups)

Doubles: 13 (11 titles, 2 runner-ups)

Top 10 wins

Notes

References

External links

 
 
 

1986 births
Living people
People from Bern-Mittelland District
Swiss female tennis players
Swiss people of Italian descent
Italian female tennis players
Italian people of Swiss descent
Citizens of Italy through descent
Naturalised tennis players
Sportspeople from the canton of Bern